Pierre Gambini (born in Corte, Corsica) is a French songwriter and composer.

He started in the 1990s as part of the musical formation I Cantelli singing polyphonic Corsican songs and launched a solo career after singing with in the film Sempre Vivu! in 2006. He then launched an electro rock career.

He is most famous for writing the soundtrack and music score for the fourth season of the Corsican-themed French TV series Mafiosa broadcast in 2012 and for the follow-up Mafiosa - L'ultime saison in 2014.

Discography

Albums and EPs
Un omu ordinariu (7 tracks recorded during Mezzo Voce, 2007) 
Altru mondu (4 tracks, Mediterranean roots and Northern pop, 2010)
Albe sistematiche (11-track album, 2011)
Pierre Gambini EP (4 tracks, 2014)

Soundtracks

Singles

Filmography
2007: Sempre vivu! - a musician

References

External links
Official website
Facebook

French songwriters
Male songwriters
French composers
French male composers
Living people
Year of birth missing (living people)